Mix Master is a South Korea–Japan co-produced anime series based on the massively multiplayer online role-playing game Mix Master: King of Cards. It is a co-production of Nippon Animation Japan and Sunwoo Entertainment and KBS of Korea. The series aired on Cartoon Network in many Asian areas from the Far East to the Middle East. The story centers on the fantasy and adventure card game, Mix Master.

Plot
The series takes place in the town of Gamebridge where, through the accidental opening of a portal from the fictional Mix Master video game world of Atreia, the peaceful little town is invaded by the funny and sometimes dangerous game creatures, known as "hench", as well as the game world's evil Prince Brad. The main protagonist, 11-year-old Ditt Lee, is given a card shuffler by the eccentric Dr. Joeb, and now must "mix" those hench (as learned from the fictional video game) to achieve peace and safety, while he grows into his destiny to become the one true "Mix Master".

The series presented over two hundred henches from different species. They can be fused or 'mixed' together to form a new, stronger hench. Henches are ranked from 1 (low) to 7 (high) depending on their power. Animals and plants are present. To be mixed, henches must be of the same rank and species. Henches are shown to be like humans, as they can sleep, eat, talk and tire out if they are overused. They bond with humans who show honesty and friendship. They have to obey the orders of the person who owns their card shuffler, even against their will. They seem to grow old and die.

Although Henches are ranked as high as 7, above level 7 one hench is known as the Ultimate Hench and is the most powerful. Ultimate Hench exists when all the 8 Henches of Rank 7 are fused with the help of the Mix Master and The Master Hench. According to legend, the Master Hench has to find one human friend whom it trusts above all else, and that human becomes the Mix Master. It appears that the Master Henches are somehow related, as Pachi's brother was the previous Master Hench. The Master Hench can be mixed to become the ultimate Hench that can defeat Giara.

The series was followed by a sequel season, Final Force.

Characters

Protagonists

Antagonists

Episodes

Voice actors

See also
 aeni

External links
KBS Mix Master Homepage
Sunwoo Entertainment Mix Master Homepage
Spanish translation at Babalúvox

 
2005 South Korean television series debuts
2006 South Korean television series endings
Japanese children's animated action television series
Japanese children's animated adventure television series
Japanese children's animated fantasy television series
South Korean children's animated action television series
South Korean children's animated adventure television series
South Korean children's animated fantasy television series
Card games in anime and manga
Animated television series about children